The 2014 Tajik Football Super Cup was the 5th Tajik Supercup match, a football match which was contested between the 2013 Tajik League champions, Ravshan, and the Tajik Cup champions, Istiklol.

Match details

See also
2014 Tajik League
2014 Tajik Cup

References

Super Cup
Tajik Supercup
Tajik Super Cup